Barza may refer to several villages in Romania:

 Barza, a village in the commune of Dănești, Gorj
 Barza, a village in Crișcior Commune, Hunedoara County
 Barza, a village in Tufeni Commune, Olt County
 Barza, a village in the commune of Budești, Vâlcea

Other
 Bârza, a commune in Olt County
 Barza, the Hungarian name for Bârsa Commune, Arad County